Mevagissey was an electoral division of Cornwall in the United Kingdom which returned one member to sit on Cornwall Council between 2009 and 2021. It was abolished at the 2021 local elections, being succeeded by Mevagissey and St Austell Bay, St Goran, Tregony and the Roseland, and St Mewan and Grampound.

Councillors

Extent
Mevagissey division represented the villages of Mevagissey, London Apprentice, Pentewan, Portmellon, Boswinger, Gorran Churchtown and Gorran Haven, and the hamlets of Tregorrick, Levalsa Meor, Trevarrick, Rescassa, Treveor and Penare. It also covered some of Duporth (most of which was represented by the St Austell Bay division).

The division was affected by boundary changes at the 2013 election. From 2009 to 2013, the division covered 4011 hectares in total; after the boundary changes in 2013, it covered 3737 hectares.

Election results

2017 election

2014 by-election

2013 election

2009 election

References

Electoral divisions of Cornwall Council